Tetramethyluric acid may refer to:

 Methylliberine (O2,1,7,9-tetramethyluric acid)
 Theacrine (1,3,7,9-tetramethyluric acid)